Konarestan-e Sofla (also Romanized as Konārestān-e Soflá; also known as Konārestān) is a village in Dalfard Rural District, Sarduiyeh District, Jiroft County, Kerman Province, Iran. At the 2006 census, its population was 137, in 28 families.

References 

Populated places in Jiroft County